Juliet Ehimuan is a Nigerian technology expert and entrepreneur who currently serves as Google's Country Manager in Nigeria. In August 2011, she was listed in Forbes ' "20 Youngest Power Women In Africa".

Early life and education
Born in Nigeria, Ehimuan completed her B.Eng. degree in Computer Engineering from Obafemi Awolowo University, Ile-Ife, with a first-class honours. She proceeded to obtain a postgraduate degree in Computer Science from the University of Cambridge, United Kingdom before she went on to complete her MBA programme from London Business School.

Career
In 1995, Ehimuan began career as Performance Monitoring and Quality Assurance Supervisor at the Shell Petroleum Development Company until 1997 when she left the firm. She then joined Microsoft UK as a Program Manager who oversaw projects for MSN subsidiaries in Europe, Middle East, and Africa; and then Business Process Manager for MSN International.

Upon leaving Microsoft in 2005, she started a firm called Strategic Insight Consulting Ltd. and then later became the General Manager of Chams Plc's Strategic Business Units. In April 2011, she was appointed Google's Country Manager for Nigeria.

Awards and recognitions
A Fellow of the Cambridge Commonwealth Society, Ehimuan's contributions to technology and entrepreneurship has won her several awards and recognitions. She is a recipient of the London Business School Global Women's Scholarship, and while at the University of Cambridge, she received two scholarly awards – Selwyn College Scholar and Malaysian Commonwealth Scholar. In 2012, she won the "IT Personality of the Year" at the 2012 National Information Technology Merit Award. She was also ranked among the 50 Most Innovative Youths in Nigeria in 2021

Juliet Ehimuan was named one of the "15 African Female Founders You Should Know in 2023" by African Folder in March 2023.

References

Living people
Alumni of the University of Cambridge
Obafemi Awolowo University alumni
Alumni of London Business School
Nigerian women in business
Google people
Year of birth missing (living people)